Bruce Wolfe's bronze statue of Barbara Jordan at the Austin–Bergstrom International Airport in Austin, Texas, was erected in 2002.

See also

 2002 in art

References

2002 establishments in Texas
2002 sculptures
Bronze sculptures in Texas
Monuments and memorials in Texas
Sculptures of women in Texas
Statues in Texas
Austin–Bergstrom International Airport